Marija Damjanović (born 16 August 2000) is a Bosnia and Herzegovina footballer who plays as a forward for Ženska Premijer Liga BiH club ZFK Lokomotiva Brčko and the Bosnia and Herzegovina women's national team.

References

2000 births
Living people
Women's association football forwards
Bosnia and Herzegovina women's footballers
Bosnia and Herzegovina women's international footballers